Wesley James Enoch  (born 1969) is an Australian playwright and artistic director. He is especially known for The 7 Stages of Grieving, co-written with Deborah Mailman. He was artistic director of the Queensland Theatre Company from mid-2010 until October 2015, and completed a five-year stint as director of the Sydney Festival in February 2021.

Biography

Wesley James Enoch was born on North Stradbroke Island/Minjerribah in 1969, the eldest son of Doug and Lyn Enoch. and grew up in Brisbane. He has four siblings and is the younger brother of Queensland government minister Leeanne Enoch. His heritage is Nunukul and Ngugi (two of three Quandamooka peoples from Stradbroke Island), but also has a mixture of Irish, English and Scottish blood, and Danish and Spanish blood on his (non-Indigenous) mother's side, and Filipino, Pacific Islander and Kandju heritage on his father's.

Enoch earned a Bachelor of Arts (Honours) degree at Queensland University of Technology (QUT).

 Enoch is the  domestic partner of past artistic director of Australian Ballet, David McAllister , since around 2008, although they have lived in different cities for much of the time.

Career
From 1994 to 1997, Enoch was artistic director at Kooemba Jdarra Indigenous Performing Arts, where he directed a number of his own works. In 1998 he became Associate Artist at the Queensland Theatre Company, then served a term from 2000 to 2001 as resident director at Sydney Theatre Company. From 2003 to 2006, he was artistic director at Ilbijerri Aboriginal Torres Strait Islander Theatre Co-operative, remaining on the board until 2007. During his time at Ilbijerri, Enoch  directed a number of Company B (later Belvoir) productions, including his own Black Medea in collaboration with Malthouse Theatre), and The Sapphires with Melbourne Theatre Company.

From 2006 to 2008, took up the role of associate artistic director for Company B at the Belvoir St Theatre.

Other major theatre companies he has worked with include State Theatre Company of South Australia, Black Swan Theatre, Griffin Theatre Company, Hothouse Theatre, Yirra Yaakin, and Windmill Theatre .

In June 2010, his appointment as the new artistic director of the Queensland Theatre Company was announced, taking over from Michael Gow. He had previously directed several plays at the Company, and been an associate artist. He started in the new role firstly on a part-time basis from July 2010, and then full-time in January 2011.

Enoch worked with Tom Wright to develop his play Black Diggers, about Indigenous soldiers in World War I, which under Enoch's direction premiered at the Sydney Opera House in 2014 to great acclaim and was later performed in other states.

He left Queensland Theatre to become director of the Sydney Festival in October 2015, and served as director from February 2017 for a five-year term, with his last festival in 2021. During his time there, he introduced many works offering a wide range of perspectives by First Nations artists.

In March 2021 Enoch was appointed to the inaugural Indigenous Chair in the Creative Industries at QUT.

Other roles
2006 Commonwealth Games Opening Ceremony, Director of the Indigenous section
2008 Festival of Pacific Arts (FOPA), Artistic Director for the Australian delegation
2018 Nick Enright Address at the National Playwrighting Festival
2018 Commonwealth Games on the Gold Coast, creative consultant, segment director and Indigenous consultant
Hothouse Theatre Artistic Directorate member
Former Sydney Opera House Trustee
Member of the New South Wales Government's Arts Advisory Council
Member of the external advisory panel to the Assemblage Centre for Creative Arts at Flinders University, headed by Garry Stewart

Written works

The 7 Stages of Grieving
Enoch is best-known for The 7 Stages of Grieving, a one-actor play co-written with Deborah Mailman in 1995 and first performed at the Metro Arts Theatre in Brisbane by Kooemba Jdarra Indigenous Performing Arts, with Mailman in the solo role and Enoch directing, on 1 September 1995. The play was published in book form in 1996, and has been much studied and written about since.

The title refers to seven phases of Aboriginal history, with the words referencing Elisabeth Kübler-Ross's model commonly known as the five stages of grief. The stages in the play move from the Dreaming to a future of where Aboriginal self-determination and reconciliation  with settler Australians has been achieved. The seven stages comprise: Dreaming, Invasion, Genocide, Protection, Assimilation, Self-Determination and Reconciliation. The concept of the seven phases of Aboriginal history were identified and named as such by Michael Williams, director of Aboriginal and Torres Strait Islander studies at the University of Queensland when Enoch was teaching and Mailman was studying there during the 1990s. The linking of Kübler-Ross's model and Williams' framework that started the examination of "the concept that Indigenous history has been a long and complicated grieving process since colonisation". Using traditional cultural forms of "dance, song, music, visuals and storytelling", they workshopped their ideas for two years before first presenting a 30-minute version, and then developed it further along with dramaturge Hilary Beaton to its full length, presented in 1995. The play was during the early years of a formal reconciliation process in Australia, and not long after Enoch's grandmother had died on Minjerribah and Enoch had participated in some of the ancient Aboriginal rites associated with death and burial.

There were numerous performances of the play around Australia in the 1990s, as well as being performed at the Battersea Arts Centre in London as part of the London International Festival of Theatre in 1997. It has had several runs in Sydney, Adelaide and Brisbane during the 21st century. A touring production by the Sydney Theatre Company was originally scheduled for 2020, but, interrupted by the COVID-19 pandemic in Australia, was postponed until mid-2021. This production, directed by Shari Sebbens and performed by Elaine Crombie, is being staged in Sydney, Adelaide and Canberra.

Other works
Grace (1998) is a short film, first screened around Australia in a group of six short films, collectively titled "Shifting Sands".

Other works written by Enoch include:
 Little White Dress
 A Life of Grace and Piety (1998)
 The Sunshine Club (1999)
 Black Medea (2000)
 The Story of the Miracles at Cookie's Table (2006)
 I Am Eora (2012)

Recognition
In 2002, Enoch was the recipient of an Australia Council for the Arts residency at the Cité internationale des arts in Paris.

The Sapphires (2004) won Helpmann Awards for Best Production and Best New Australian Work; remounted at the 2005 Sydney Festival

His The Story of the Miracles at Cookie's Table won the 2005 Patrick White Playwrights' Award,

Enoch was awarded the Member of the Order of Australia in the Australia Day Honours in 2020, "For significant service to the performing arts as an Indigenous director and playwright".

Productions 
Works directed and/or produced by Enoch include:

 Appropriate, STC
Bitin' Back, Kooemba Jdarra
 The Sapphires (2004)
 The Cherry Pickers, by Kevin Gilbert
 Stolen
 Parramatta Girls, by Alana Valentine
 Fountains Beyond
 Purple Dreams
 Paul, by Howard Brenton
 EORA Crossing
 RiverlanD, by Scott Rankin
 Fountains Beyond
 Romeo and Juliet, Bell Shakespeare
 Black-ed Up
 The Dreamers
 Wonderlands
 Conversations with the Dead
 Rainbow's End, Koeemba Jdarra
 One Night the Moon, Malthouse Theatre
 Mother Courage and Her Children, QTC
 Bombshells, QTC
 Head Full of Love, QTC
 Black Diggers, QTC/Sydney Festival
 Trollop, by Maxine Mellor

Footnotes

References

Further reading
 Bollig, Barbara. Transcultural Appropriations of the Medea Myth: Jackie Crossland's "Collateral Damage", Wesley Enoch's "Black Medea", Cherrie Moraga's "The Hungry Woman" and Dea Loher's "Manhattan Medea". Thesis for Master's degree, Zentrum für Kanada-Studien Universität Trier 2017, Chair Ralf Hertel

External links

1969 births
Living people
21st-century Australian dramatists and playwrights
Australian people of English descent
Australian people of Irish descent
Australian people of Scottish descent
Australian theatre directors
Indigenous Australian writers
Queensland University of Technology alumni
Australian LGBT dramatists and playwrights
Members of the Order of Australia
People from Redland City
Australian male dramatists and playwrights